The 2022–23 Highland Football League (known as the Breedon Highland League for sponsorship reasons) is the 120th season of the Highland Football League, and the 9th season as part of the fifth tier of the Scottish football pyramid system. Fraserburgh are the reigning champions.

Banks O' Dee joined having become the first club to be promoted into the Highland League, replacing Fort William whose 37-year stay in the division came to an end.

Teams

From Highland League
Relegated to North Caledonian League
Fort William

To Highland League
Promoted from North Superleague
Banks O' Dee

Stadia and locations
All grounds are equipped with floodlights as required by league regulations.

League table

Results

Highland League play-off
Subject to the tier 6 champion clubs meeting the required licensing criteria for promotion, a play-off will take place between the winners of the 2022–23 Midlands Football League, 2022–23 North Caledonian Football League and the 2022–23 North Superleague, who will then play the club finishing bottom of the Highland League. However if no champion club meets the criteria there will be no promotion to, or relegation from the Highland League.

References

External links

Highland Football League seasons
2022–23 in Scottish football leagues
SCO
Sco5